Cryptophasa insana is a moth in the family Xyloryctidae. It was described by Felder & Rogenhofer in 1875. It is found in Australia, where it has been recorded from South Australia and Western Australia.

The ground color of forewings is yellow.

References

Cryptophasa
Moths described in 1875